Back Streets of Paris (French: Macadam) is a 1946 French crime film directed by Marcel Blistène. Jacques Feyder also contributed to the film in the role of artistic director.

Plot 
This story involves Madame Rose, a hotelkeeper in a Paris suburb who will stop at nothing, including murder. Other characters include one of her former accomplices who carries a suitcase full of cash, a kindhearted street vendor, the gangster's mistress, and the landlady's daughter, Simone, who dreams of a better life.

Cast
 Françoise Rosay: Madame Rose, the owner of the hotel Bijou
 Paul Meurisse: Victor Menard, former accomplice of Madame Rose
 Simone Signoret: Gisèle
 André Roanne: Marvejoul
 Andrée Clément: Simone, Madame Rose's daughter
 Jacques Dacqmine: Francois, the kindhearted street vendor
 Paul Demange: Marcel the hairdresser
 Jeannette Batti: Mona
 Marcelle Rexiane: The bar owner
 Liliane Lesaffre: A gossip
 Yvonne Yma: An inmate's wife
 Georges Bever: Armand
 Félix Oudart: Leon
 André Nicard: The sheet stealer
 François Joux: An inspector
 Richard Francœur: The butler
 Jean Berton: Gazon
 Roger Vincent: The gentleman from Le Mans
 Franck Maurice: An agent
 Félix Clément
 Max Simone: The laundress
 Jacqueline Fontaine
 Marcel Rouze
 Paul Barge
 Maurice Cartier
 Pierre Juvenet
 Charles Deschamps
 Georges Dietrich

Production
Filming took place between June and August 1946 at the Studios de Saint-Maurice, with exterior scenes filmed at the Zoo de Vincennes. Jean d'Eaubonne was the set designer.

Jacques Feyder is credited as artistic director ("direction artistique"). Although Feyder was ill at the time, according to Françoise Rosay (his wife) he was asked to supervise filming because various members of the crew had no confidence in the young and inexperienced director, Marcel Blistène. Relations on the set between Blistène and Feyder were hostile, and once filming was finished it was Feyder who oversaw the editing.

References

External links
 
 
 Macadam at Ciné-Ressources.

1946 films
1946 crime drama films
1940s French-language films
French black-and-white films
Films set in Paris
Films directed by Marcel Blistène
French crime drama films
1940s French films